Tim Cantor (born August 10, 1969) is an American self-taught surrealism artist and writer. Tim was raised in Marin County, California and began painting at the age of 5 using a box of oil paints and brushes that were his great-grandfather's. Tim's great-grandfather was the English Artist, Lloyd Dundas Whiffen (1885-1951). His first oil painting was created at the age of 5. When Tim was 15, he won a Bank of America achievement in arts award. Also at the age of 15, Tim was given his first gallery exhibition where one of his paintings was acquired to hang in the White House. Tim has since had exhibitions in Athens, Tokyo, Singapore, Paris, Venice, New York, Beverly Hills and San Francisco. He currently has galleries in San Diego, Sausalito, California, and Amsterdam which are dedicated to his vision and his art. Cantor currently lives and works in Southern California.

Works
Tim Cantor paints in oils on a variety of different surfaces. He learned on his own since early childhood, almost exclusively in oils however he often uses other media such as watercolor and charcoal to create studies for larger compositions. Tim has a traditional style using brushes and paint and utilizes no tools or devices in his work.

Many of his works are based on his own fictional and non-fictional stories and poetry. These stories, he says, mostly come to him during the long process of creating the paintings.

Exhibitions
Tim Cantor began showing his paintings professionally at the age of 15 when he was honored with the Bank of America achievement in arts award. At his first show, Senator Barbara Boxer presented the award and then chose a painting to hang in the White House. The early publicity created a demand for his work. After finishing high school in Marin County, he began traveling and exhibiting his paintings in galleries and open-air events throughout the Western United States. After seven years on the road he decided to display his paintings exclusively in fine art galleries and then in 2000, Tim Cantor established Ashby Galleries. Ashby Galleries and Ashby and Alfred publications are devoted exclusively to Tim Cantor and display his work year-round. One of Tim Cantor's paintings is in the permanent collection of the White House. Some of his well-known collectors include baseball player Bob Scanlan, football player Dhani Jones, actors Terrence Howard, Robert De Niro, Robert Redford, director Guillermo del Toro, actress Maggie Q and the rock band Imagine Dragons.

Tim Cantor and his artwork are currently on tour with the band Imagine Dragons for their Smoke + Mirrors North American Tour. Most of the Imagine Dragons North American tour stops will feature a SMOKE + MIRRORS ART GALLERY in the venue, showcasing original album and single art by Tim Cantor and immersive new mixes Imagine Dragons album featuring DTS Headphone:X technology.

In 2016, Tim Cantor exhibited his art in New York City. The exhibit, Titled "Tim Cantor: Sweet Favour & Fiend", could be seen at AFA Art Gallery in Soho, NYC through August 2016.In 2019, Tim Cantor released his Yesteryear exhibition.

In the winter of 2019, The Tim Cantor Gallery of Amsterdam, located in a 17th century building in the core of Amsterdam, opened with has a collection of Cantor's works. On March 17, 2021, Tim Cantor, in a partnership with Terra Virtua ltd the world's first fully-immersive entertainment platform, took six of his traditional oil paintings and enhanced them using animation techniques to bring them to life.

Spring 2021 brought a Live NFT Art Exhibition with Artist Tim Cantor. It was the first-ever live virtual reality exhibition with Tim Cantor who is the man behind the Imagine Dragons 2014 album, stage designs and video, 'SHOTS'.

Publications and media
In 2005 Tim established Ashby Galleries and Ashby and Alfred Publications and also published a book in 2005 titled The Art of Tim Cantor.

Harvest Productions, in 2011, released a releasing a short film looking at the Art of Tim Cantor. This film features interviews with Tim and Amy Cantor, as well as some of his closest collectors.

In June 2011, Tim Cantor and his piece "Beauty's Privilege" were featured on the cover of San Diego's City Beat Magazine. The article discusses his gallery in San Diego as well as his work on a new book and a new collection of art and writings.

Tim Cantor is currently (January 2012) the featured artist on the website of Fear & Trembling Productions. Fear & Trembling Productions is a not-for-profit company whose goal is to work with a select group of talented singer/songwriters as their Artist Development Manager to help them gain recognition by the recording industry. They have recognized Tim Cantor's gallery due to the fact that in his galleries Tim uses soothing background music to allow each viewer of his art to absorb and interpret the beauty of his art undisturbed.

On November 3, 2012, over 3000 people attended Tim Cantor's 2nd major book release and exhibition of new works at his Gaslamp Gallery in San Diego. His new book is titled, "Tim Cantor, Paintings & Writings Book II". 

In 2015, Tim Cantor’s work was featured in the Imagine Dragons Smoke + Mirrors North American, European and Asian tours.

Recording Artist Bebe Rexha features Tim Cantor Art in her video for her song "Sabotage" from her Album Better Mistakes.

Evanescence features Tim Cantor Art in their video for their song "Across the Universe" .

Projects
In May 2010, Tim Cantor was asked to participate in a project called Art Meets Fashion. In partnership with the San Diego Visual Arts Network (SDVAN) and Fashion Opportunities Connect US (FOCUS), The Art Meets Fashion mission is to initiate collaborations between established fashion designers and visual artists of excellence, to showcase the creativity in San Diego, and to encourage local teens to be involved in the Arts.

Tim and international fashion designer, Gordana Gehlhausen have been inspired to create works of art which express an emotional impression of loss, love, and ultimately- finding beauty in the midst of tragedy and adversity. Along with Gordana, Tim will be working with David Hartig, a photographer who will document the various steps involved to nurture an idea into a work of art and Denise Bonaimo (educator/ visual artist) will create a lesson plan that focuses on drawing from life experiences as the inspiration to create works of art with emotion. 

Currently the project is ongoing and will continue through 2011 and will include fashion shows and exhibitions of the team's final projects including a VIP fashion show at the San Diego International Airport in April 2011. The Art Meets Fashion Event will host a VIP fashion show on Thursday, April 28, 2011 at the San Diego International Airport Series of independent exhibitions for each of the teams 3 hubs including NTC Promenade at Liberty Station, North Park and Downtown San Diego. Beauty's Privilege project will be exhibited at Shop Goga in downtown San Diego in April 2011 (TBA). One group exhibit, which will present highlights of each team at the San Diego International Airport from April –Sept 2011.

On September 23, 2014, Cantor began working with Imagine Dragons for their second studio album, Smoke + Mirrors. After meeting the band and becoming inspired by the music and lyrics of their upcoming single, Tim Cantor created artworks for each song of the album. All three singles released – "I Bet My Life", "Gold", and "Shots" – feature the paintings as cover art. The paintings are included in the limited edition of the album. The artworks make appearance in the band's music video of "Shots".

In June 2016 Tim's Art was exhibited at the AFA Gallery in SOHO New York. "Tim Cantor: Sweet Favour & Fiend" at AFA was a showing of Tim's oil paintings which offered a disquieting remix of historical Renaissance canvases.

March 2021 - Partnership with Terra Virtua the world’s first fully immersive digital collectibles platform announces today an exclusive partnership with world-famous artist, Tim Cantor, which will see six of Tim’s incredible oil paintings brought to life through animation.

March 2021 - Tim Cantor has joined the Digital Arts NFTs Space. According to a press release shared with Altcoin Buzz, Tim Cantor has enlisted the support of top digital collectible firm Terra Virtua with plans to transform six of his oil paintings into digital art pieces (NFTs). Terra Virtua is known as the first-ever immersive digital collectible platform in the world.

November 2021 - Tim Cantor’s En Pointe is transformed into an NFT for the first time with Terra Virtua – Terra Virtua Blog. Tim Cantor’s new NFT, En Pointe, merges the digital and classical art worlds and provides an extraordinary glimpse behind the curtain of creation.

References

External links
 The Art Of Tim Cantor Official Website
 AFA Art Gallery NYC

Living people
American artists
1969 births